Pühtitsa Convent (Estonian: Kuremäe Jumalaema Uinumise nunnaklooster, Russian: Пюхтицкий Успенский женский монастырь) is a Russian Orthodox convent in Eastern Estonia (Ida-Viru County) between Lake Peipus and the Gulf of Finland. A small Orthodox Christian church was built in Pühtitsa in the 16th century. The convent was founded in 1891 and has grown into the largest Orthodox community in the Baltic states.

History
The convent is located on a site known as Pühitsetud ("blessed" in Estonian) since ancient times. According to a legend, a shepherd from the village of Kuremäe witnessed a divine revelation near a spring of water to this day venerated as holy. Later in the 16th century, locals found an ancient icon of Dormition of the Mother of God under a huge oak tree. The icon still belongs to the convent.

In 1888, the Russian Orthodox Church sent a nun from the Ipatiev Monastery in Kostroma to establish a convent in Pühtitsa. The katholikon was built to Mikhail Preobrazhensky's designs in the Russian Revival style. It was consecrated in 1910.

There are six churches in the convent dedicated to a number of Orthodox Christian Saints such as St. Sergius of Radonezh, St. Simeon the Receiver of God, St. Nicholas, St. Anna the Prophetess and others. Prince , the Governor of Estland, was convent's patron and protected it from local landowners, mostly German Lutherans, who opposed the spread of Orthodoxy in Estland. It was the first Orthodox monastery built in Estonia (to the delight of mostly Orthodox local peasants of Jõhvi county). 

In 1919, after Estonia became independent from Russia, the new government confiscated most of the convent's land and transferred the convent to the Estonian Apostolic Orthodox Church, independent of Moscow. During the Second World War the battlefront was at times only a few kilometres away from the convent and Germans organized a concentration camp for Russian prisoners of war inside the monastery compound.

Following the second invasion and occupation of Estonia by the Soviet Union in 1944, the convent managed to survive despite the uneasy co-existence with the Communist authorities. Patriarch Alexius II who was the bishop (later the archbishop) of Tallinn and Estonia in the 1960s was instrumental in the fight to keep the convent from closure.

The Pühtitsa Convent and the Pskov-Caves Monastery were the only monasteries in the Soviet Union that did not suspend their activities throughout the 20th century. By 1991, the Pühtitsa monastic community consisted of 161 nuns. In 1990 it was placed under the direct authority of the Patriarch of Moscow and All Russia.

See also
 List of Christian religious houses in Estonia
 Ioannovsky Convent

External links

  Estonian Orthodox Church of Moscow Patriarchate - Pühtitsa (Pyhtitsa) Dormition Convent
  Le Couvent de Pühtitsa à Kuremäe
  Orthodox holy places - the Silver Ring of Russia
 Entrance to the Pühtitsa Convent QTVR fullscreen panorama (July 8, 2007)

Eastern Orthodox churches in Estonia
Russian Orthodox monasteries
Religious organizations established in 1891
Alutaguse Parish
Buildings and structures in Ida-Viru County
Christian monasteries in Estonia
1890s establishments in Estonia
Russian Revival architecture
1891 establishments in the Russian Empire
Russians in Estonia
Tourist attractions in Ida-Viru County